Mount Nebo State Forest is a  state forest in the state of Maryland.

References

External links
U.S. Geological Survey Map at the U.S. Geological Survey Map Website. Retrieved January 11, 2023.

Maryland state forests
Protected areas of Garrett County, Maryland